Balakan Airport is an airport serving Balakan, the capital of the Balakan District of Azerbaijan.

Facilities

References

Airports in Azerbaijan
Balakan District